Tɔli (Toli) is a Gbe language of Benin. Ethnologue counts it and Alada as dialects of Gun, but Capo (1988) considers it one of the Phla–Pherá languages.

References

Gbe languages
Languages of Benin